BookBrainz is a free and open source bibliographic database. It aims to store data about every book, magazine, journal or other publication ever written. It is a MetaBrainz Foundation project that is allied with MusicBrainz. It has been endorsed by the Open Data Institute and participates in the Google Summer of Code yearly.

BookBrainz uses UUIDs for entities and allows for detailed relationships between entities such as authors, works, editions and publishers. It also catalogs identities like Wikidata, OpenLibrary, Goodreads, LibraryThing and ISBN IDs for entities.

References

External links
 BookBrainz

MusicBrainz
Social cataloging applications
Free-content websites
Bibliographic databases and indexes